The 2019 Petit Le Mans (formally known as the 2019 MOTUL Petit Le Mans for sponsorship reasons) was the 22nd running of the Petit Le Mans, and was held on October 12th 2019. It was the last race in the 2019 IMSA WeatherTech Sportscar Championship, and the last race of the 2019 Michelin Endurance Cup, and was run at Road Atlanta in Braselton, Georgia. The race was won overall by the #31 Whelen Engineering Racing Cadillac DPi-V.R after its sister car fell out with brake failure with less than 30 minutes remaining. The distance covered was a race record.

Qualifying 
Felipe Nasr secured overall pole for the event.

Qualifying results 

  The No. 29 Montaplast by Land-Motorsport entry had all qualifying laps forfeited
  The No. 47 Precision Performance Motorsports entry had all qualifying laps forfeited

Race

Results

References

Petit Le Mans
2019 WeatherTech SportsCar Championship season
2019 in sports in Georgia (U.S. state)
Petit Le Mans